Trdina is a surname. Notable people with the surname include:

 Janez Trdina (1830–1905), Slovenian writer and historian
 Tadej Trdina (born 1988), Slovenian footballer

See also
 Trina (name)

Slovene-language surnames